Ramaniyechiyude Namathil is a 2015 Malayalam short film directed by Liju Thomasstarring Arun Kumar and Para Babu. The film was screened at various festivals such as FEFKA short film festival and received many accolades. It won the first prize in the Shoot an Idea competition organised by Kappa TV.

The team joined with Asif Ali for the movie Kavi Uddheshichathu..? was released on 8 October 2016.

Plot

A snake is doing an important role in this short film. Besides the snake, there are two characters in it — Ramani chechi’s husband and his friend. The husband suspects that his friend admires Ramani chechi. It is this suspicion that leads him to push his friend into the well to get bitten by the snake.

Cast

Arun Kumar as Friend
Para Babu as Husband

Awards and honours
The awards and honours received by Ramaniyechiyude Namathil are:
BEST FILM FEFKA SHORT FILM FEST 2014
BEST FILM KAPPA TV SHOOT AN IDEA CONTEST SEASON 2
BEST DIRECTOR STATE SHORT FILM FEST ALAPPUZHA 2015
BEST FILM FESTTELLEN SHORT FILM FEST BANGALORE 2015
BEST EDITOR – FESTTELLEN SHORT FILM FEST BANGALORE 2015
BEST DIRECTOR – KOCHIN INTERNATIONAL SHORT FILM FEST 2015
BEST ACTOR – KOCHIN INTERNATIONAL SHORT FILM FEST 2015
BEST EDITOR – KOCHIN INTERNATIONAL SHORT FILM FEST 2015
BEST FILM – BHARATH P.J ANTONY SHORT FILM FEST THRISSUR 2015
BEST DIRECTOR – BHARATH P.J ANTONY SHORT FILM FEST THRISSUR 2015
BEST SCRIPT – BHARATH P.J ANTONY SHORT FILM FEST THRISSUR 2015
BEST EDITOR – BHARATH P.J ANTONY SHORT FILM FEST THRISSUR 2015
BEST ACTOR – BHARATH P.J ANTONY SHORT FILM FEST THRISSUR 2015
BEST CAMERA – BHARATH P.J ANTONY SHORT FILM FEST THRISSUR 2015
BEST SOUND MIX – BHARATH P.J ANTONY SHORT FILM FEST THRISSUR 2015
BEST DIRECTOR – EKTA SHORT FIL FEST CALICUT 2015
2ND BEST FILM – EKTA SHORT FIL FEST CALICUT 2015
BEST ACTOR – IFLF SHORT FILM FEST TRIVANDRUM 2015
BEST DIRECTOR – CONTACT SHORT FILM FEST TRIVANDRUM
BEST FILM – MADIKAI SHORT FIL FEST 2014
BEST DIRECTOR – MADIKAI SHORT FIL FEST 2014
BEST FILM – KANNUR FILM CHAMBER AWARD 2015
BEST DIRECTOR – KANNUR FILM CHAMBER AWARD 2015
BEST SCRIPT – MESSAGE TELE FEST CHERTHALA 2015
BEST EDITOR – MIRROR SHORT FILM FEST EKM 2015
BEST FILM – KALAKSHETHA SHORT FILM FEST MES COLLEGE 2015
BEST SOUND MIX – DON BOSCO INTERNATIONAL FEST COCIN 2014

References

2015 short films
2010s Malayalam-language films